Rufus Brown Bullock (March 28, 1834 – April 27, 1907) was a Republican Party politician and businessman in Georgia. During the Reconstruction Era he served as the state's governor and called for equal economic opportunity and political rights for blacks and whites in Georgia. He also promoted public education for both, and encouraged railroads, banks, and industrial development. During his governorship he requested federal military help to ensure the rights of freedmen; this made him "the most hated man in the state", and he had to flee the state without completing his term. After returning to Georgia and being found "not guilty" of corruption charges, for three decades afterwards he was an esteemed private citizen.

Early life
Bullock was born in Bethlehem, New York and moved to Augusta, Georgia, in 1857 for his job with the telegraph company Adams Express.

Political life
Bullock served as the 46th Governor of Georgia from 1868 to 1871 during Reconstruction and was the first Republican governor of Georgia. After Georgia ratified the Fourteenth Amendment to the Constitution, the Omnibus Act declared that states were entitled to representation in Congress as one of the states of the Union. Georgia again lost the right to representation in Congress because the General Assembly expelled twenty-eight black members and prevented blacks from voting in the 1868 presidential election (see Original 33). In response to an appeal from Bullock, Georgia was again placed under military rule as part of the Georgia Act of December 22, 1869. This made Bullock a hated political figure. After various allegations of scandal and ridicule, in 1871 he was obliged by the Ku Klux Klan to resign the governorship, and felt it prudent to leave the state. He was succeeded by Republican State Senate president Benjamin Conley, who served as Governor for the two remaining months of the term to which Bullock had been elected. Conley was succeeded by James M. Smith, a Democrat, and no Republican would serve as governor of Georgia again until Sonny Perdue in 2003.

Postbellum life
Bullock served as president of the Macon and Augusta Railroad in 1867, and established the Augusta First National Bank. He later became president of the Atlanta Chamber of Commerce, and in 1895 served as master of ceremonies for the Cotton States and International Exposition. Bullock introduced the speaker, Booker T. Washington, who gave his famous "Atlanta Compromise" speech.

Death and legacy
Bullock died in Albion, New York, in 1907 and was buried in Mt. Albion Cemetery nearby.

Bullock has had both detractors and admirers. According to the New Georgia Encyclopedia, he was the last progressive governor of Georgia until Jimmy Carter.

He is the only governor of Georgia since 1850 of whom there is no portrait in the Georgia State Capitol.

References

Further reading
Entrepreneur for Equality: Governor Rufus Bullock, Commerce, and Race in Post-Civil War Georgia (1994), Russell Duncan, University of Georgia Press, .

External links
 Georgia State Archives Roster of State Governors
 Georgia Governor's Gravesites Field Guide (1776–2003)
 March 28 article (see 1834) in This Day in Georgia History, compiled by Ed Jackson and Charles Pou
 National Governors Association page

1834 births
1907 deaths
Confederate States Army officers
Republican Party governors of Georgia (U.S. state)
Victims of the Ku Klux Klan
People from Albion, Orleans County, New York
People from Bethlehem, New York
People of Georgia (U.S. state) in the American Civil War
Politicians from Augusta, Georgia
Ku Klux Klan in Georgia (U.S. state)